Bolshoye Ignatovo (Ignadvele) is a rural locality (a selo) and the administrative center of Bolsheignatovsky District of the Republic of Mordovia, Russia. Population:

References

Notes

Sources

Rural localities in Mordovia
Bolsheignatovsky District